Pouchetia is a genus of flowering plants belonging to the family Rubiaceae.

Its native range is western Tropical Africa. It is found in Angola, Benin, Burkina, Cabinda, Central African Repu, Congo, Gabon, Gambia, Ghana, Guinea, Guinea-Bissau, Gulf of Guinea Is., Ivory Coast, Liberia, Mali, Nigeria, Senegal, Sierra Leone, Sudan, Togo and Zaïre.
 
The genus name of Pouchetia is in honour of Félix Archimède Pouchet (1800–1872), a French naturalist and a leading proponent of spontaneous generation of life from non-living materials, and as such an opponent of Louis Pasteur's germ theory. 
It was first described and published in Prodr. Vol.4 on page 393 in 1830.

Known species
According to Kew:
Pouchetia africana 
Pouchetia baumanniana 
Pouchetia confertiflora 
Pouchetia parviflora

References

Rubiaceae
Rubiaceae genera
Plants described in 1830
Flora of West Tropical Africa
Flora of West-Central Tropical Africa
Flora of Angola